Zerfe Wondemagegn (born 26 October 2002) is an Ethiopian athlete. She competed in the women's 3000 metres steeplechase event at the 2019 World Athletics Championships. She competed in the women's 3000 metres steeplechase event at the 2020 Summer Olympics.

References

External links
 

2002 births
Living people
Ethiopian female middle-distance runners
Ethiopian female steeplechase runners
Place of birth missing (living people)
World Athletics Championships athletes for Ethiopia
Athletes (track and field) at the 2020 Summer Olympics
Olympic athletes of Ethiopia
21st-century Ethiopian women